Otto Ackermann (18 October 19099 March 1960) was a Romanian conductor who made his career mainly in Switzerland.

Ackermann was born in Bucharest.  He studied at Bucharest Academy of Music and the Berlin Hochschule.

He conducted the Royal Romanian Opera on tour when aged only 15, and then held many important appointments as operatic conductor, beginning with Düsseldorf Opera, 1928-1932 (when aged 18 to 23). Then he was at Brno (1932-1935), Bern (1935-1945) and Vienna, with much travelling and concert-giving all over Europe, and recordings made with the Vienna Philharmonic, the Netherlands Philharmonic and the Zurich Tonhalle Orchestra. He held Swiss citizenship.

Ackermann was a close friend of Franz Lehár and made Columbia Records recordings of his operettas, which are distinguished by their typical Viennese lilting and phrasing, despite being made with an English orchestra (the Philharmonia Orchestra). Ackermann conducted the earlier recording of the Four Last Songs of Richard Strauss with Elisabeth Schwarzkopf.

He died at Wabern bei Bern (Bern) in March 1960, aged 50.

References

Sources 
E.M.I., A Complete List of His Master's Voice, Columbia, Parlophone and M.G.M. Long Playing Records, up to June 1955 (EMI, London 1955).

External links

1909 births
1960 deaths
Romanian conductors (music)
Berlin University of the Arts alumni
Swiss conductors (music)
Male conductors (music)
Musicians from Bucharest
People from Bern
20th-century conductors (music)
20th-century Romanian male musicians
Romanian emigrants to Switzerland